Elsie Noël Dyson (23 December 1916 – 29 June 1995) was an English character actress

Dyson played a number of roles in theatre, television and films (including in telemovies) but is best remembered as a versatile character actress in TV serials who became a familiar face to British viewers in a career spanning almost 50 years from 1949 until her death. Dyson's best remembered roles are as matriarch Ida Barlow, one of the original characters in the long-running soap opera Coronation Street (1960–61), and Nanny in the sitcom Father, Dear Father (1968–73).

Early life and career 
Dyson was born into a wealthy Manchester family (she was given the middle name Noel because she was born two days before Christmas), and was educated at the prestigious Roedean School in Brighton. Following a period at a finishing school in Paris, she returned to England and enrolled at the Royal Academy of Dramatic Art from which she graduated in 1938. She initially performed in repertory companies around Britain, in Birmingham, Oxford and Windsor and elsewhere, before moving on to London's West End.

During the Second World War, Dyson temporarily ceased acting to become a Voluntary Aid Detachment nurse, before  returning to the acting profession, initially mainly in stage productions, then from the late 1940s started to become involved with television productions. Dyson's first known TV credit came in a 1949 BBC production The Guinea Pig, and for the next decade or so she would appear, mainly in one-off supporting roles, in a number of TV programmes as well as a handful of films. Her most significant roles in this period included seven appearances in the series The Vise (first broadcast in the U.S. between October 1954 and December 1955, but not shown on TV in the UK until 1957-59) and a BBC adaptation of The Secret Garden in 1960.

Coronation Street 
In 1960 Dyson was cast in the role of Ida Barlow in the newly commissioned Coronation Street set in a fictional working class district of Salford. Ida was married to Frank Barlow, a postman, and had two sons, Ken and David. She was written as a calm-natured, placid character who frequently had to act as mediator between her hot-headed husband and son Ken, whose upwardly-mobile aspirations were seen by Frank as a rejection of his family background.

The initial commission for Coronation Street ran to 13 episodes. The first episode was transmitted on 9 December 1960 and was panned by TV critics, who predicted a short-lived ignominious fate for the programme. However, the series became an instant hit with viewers. By March 1961 Coronation Street was topping the British TV ratings with an estimated 75% of all television-owning households in the UK tuning in, and it was decided to extend its run indefinitely. This proved to be a problem for Dyson, who had only envisaged a limited commitment to the programme. Coronation Street was produced in Manchester by Granada TV while Dyson's home and family were now in London, and she did not feel able to commit to ongoing lengthy absences, so when her contract came up for renewal she declined to sign. The programme's producers decided that rather than replacing Dyson with another actress, which they felt would be unpopular with viewers, Ida would be the first regular character to die. No death scene was filmed, but in the episode of 6 September 1961 it was announced that Ida had been knocked down and killed by a bus.

Later career 
During the 1960s Dyson continued to appear regularly on TV, but was cast in either one-off productions for strands such as the BBC's The Wednesday Play and ITV's Play of the Week or supporting roles in popular shows such as Z-Cars, Dixon of Dock Green and The Likely Lads. However, she took the role of Nanny in the Thames Television sitcom Father, Dear Father which ran for seven series between 1968 and 1973 and also spawned a spin-off film in 1973. Her only other long-running TV role came as the long-suffering wife of Arthur Lowe's character in the sitcom Potter between 1979 and 1983, but she continued to make cameo appearances in many top-rated shows such as Me and My Girl, London's Burning, Bergerac, Prime Suspect and Casualty until shortly before her death. Dyson also appeared as John Hurt's mother in the 1983 film Champions. Her last credit was an episode of Heartbeat, broadcast posthumously in September 1995.

Personal life and death 
Dyson was married twice, to actor Kenneth Edwards, in 1949, and school teacher Major Harry Judge. She died of cancer on 29 June 1995, aged 78. A service of thanksgiving was held on 2 October 1995 at St Paul's, Covent Garden. The service was officiated by Canon Bill Hall, Senior Chaplain of the Actors' Church Union, and attended by many friends, including William G. Stewart, with a reading from Judge. Judge died in 2003, aged 90.

Filmography

References

External links 

 Noel Dyson page @ Corrie.net

1916 births
1995 deaths
English television actresses
English soap opera actresses
English film actresses
Alumni of RADA
People educated at Roedean School, East Sussex
Deaths from cancer in England
20th-century English actresses